is a railway station in Itoshima, Fukuoka Prefecture, Japan. It is operated by JR Kyushu and is on the Chikuhi Line.

Lines
Only local services on the Chikuhi Line stop at this station.

Station layout
The station consists of an island platforms serving two tracks with a siding. The station building is a hashigami structure which spans the tracks and has separate entrances north and south of the tracks. The waiting room is positioned on the bridge above the platform. The ticket window, also on the bridge, is unstaffed. From the bridge, a ticket gate equipped with a Sugoca card reader stands at the top of a flight of steps which leads down to the platform.

Adjacent stations

History
Fukuyoshi became a through-station on 1 April 1924 when the track was extended east to Maebaru (today ). When the Kitakyushu Railway was nationalized on 1 October 1937, Japanese Government Railways (JGR) took over control of the station and designated the line which served it as the Chikuhi Line. With the privatization of Japanese National Railways (JNR), the successor of JGR, on 1 April 1987, control of the station passed to JR Kyushu.

Passenger statistics
In fiscal 2016, the station was used by an average of 403 passengers daily (boarding passengers only), and it ranked 268th among the busiest stations of JR Kyushu.

Environs
National Route 202

See also
 List of railway stations in Japan

References

External links
Fukuyoshi Station (JR Kyushu)

Railway stations in Japan opened in 1923
Chikuhi Line
Railway stations in Fukuoka Prefecture
Stations of Kyushu Railway Company